The Japanese Rubber Workers' Union Confederation (JRC, Gomu Rengo) is a trade union representing workers in the rubber industry in Japan.

The union was founded in 1992, with the merger of the National Federation of Rubber Industry Workers' Unions and some smaller unions.  Like its largest predecessor, it was affiliated with the Japanese Trade Union Confederation, and by 1996, it had 62,307 members.  By 2020, its membership had fallen to 41,023.

External links

References

Plastics and rubber trade unions
Trade unions established in 1992
Trade unions in Japan